At the 1906 Summer Olympics in Athens, six cycling events were contested, all for men only.   Now called the Intercalated Games, the 1906 Games are no longer considered as an official Olympic Games by the International Olympic Committee.

Medal summary

Participating nations
45 cyclists from 11 nations competed.

Medal table

References

 
1906 Intercalated Games events
1906
1906 in track cycling
1906 in road cycling
1906 in cycle racing